Monte Padro is a  mountain in the department of Haute-Corse on the island of Corsica, France.
It is in the Monte Cinto massif.

Location

Monte Padro is on the ridge that defines the border between the communes of Olmi-Cappella to the north and Asco to the south.
The ridge slopes down to the east into the island's central valley.
The village of Asco is to the southeast of the mountain.
The Asco river runs past the south of the mountain, with the D147 road running parallel to the road.

Physical

The  Cima di a Statoghia is to the west, and the  Monte Corona is further to the west.
Streams draining the south slopes of Monte Padru are tributaries to the Asco river, while streams draining the northern slopes are tributaries of the Tartagine river.

Gallery

Notes

Sources

Mountains of Haute-Corse